Va’afusuaga Toleafoa Sauafea Kenneth Mark Va’afusuaga Poutoa (1967/8 - 19 January 2021) was a Samoan politician and member of the Legislative Assembly of Samoa. He was a member of the Human Rights Protection Party.

Poutoa was educated at Marist Brothers in Mulivai, St. Joseph’s College in Alafua, and the University of the South Pacific. He later became a businessman and director of the Samoa Shipping Corporation. He was first elected to parliament at the 2016 election. In 2018 he was bestowed with the Va’afusuaga title.

In January 2021 Poutoa traveled to Auckland, New Zealand, for medical treatment. He died there on 19 January.

References

1960s births
Year of birth uncertain
2021 deaths
Members of the Legislative Assembly of Samoa
Human Rights Protection Party politicians
University of the South Pacific alumni